Whatever (literally "extension of the domain of struggle") is the debut novel of French writer Michel Houellebecq, which was published in 1994 in France by Éditions Maurice Nadeau and in 1998 in the UK by Serpent's Tail. It primarily highlights the "disaggregating effects of post-Fordism on the intimate spaces of human affect" through the story of a depressed and isolated man stuck in a tedious but well-paying programming job. It was adapted into the 1999 film Whatever, directed by and starring Philippe Harel.

Plot
The protagonist, known only as "Our Hero" during the entirety of the story, lives a solitary life, and has not had sex for over two years. Within most of the book and film versions of Whatever, Our Hero draws on recollections of Schopenhauer and Kant to lambast the commodification of human contact, punctuating his inner monologue with bouts of nausea and masturbation. He is wracked by the implications of decisions that would seem minor to the average person, such as disclosing his lack of a sex life through the purchase of a single bed. He is teamed up with a disturbing, unattractive, desperate 28-year-old virgin, Raphael Tisserand, to deliver a series of seminars on the use of IT. Raphael looks up to Our Hero for ever having been able to hold down a relationship, and listens to his musings on love with tragic, but ultimately inspirational consequences.

Literary significance and criticism
Translated into English, Extension du domaine de la lutte ("extension of the domain of struggle") has been called the more succinct Whatever. Although this word does not relate to the original French title, it connects to the protagonist's defeatist view of life. The struggle of the original title is expressly associated with class struggle in a parody of Marxist slogans made popular by the Parisian student movement of 1968, in which the political revolution was extended to the sexual realm, as well as economic antagonism. "The thesis is that the sexual revolution of the Sixties created not communism but capitalism in the sexual market, that the unattractive underclass is exiled while the privileged initiates are drained by corruption, sloth, and excess."

References

External links

Information and links to critics' views of the film

1994 French novels
French novels adapted into films
French-language novels
Novels by Michel Houellebecq
Literature related to the sexual revolution
1994 debut novels
Serpent's Tail books